Col G.M. Khan (11 July 1946 – 1 May 2021) was an Indian national equestrian. He won the gold medal at 1982 Asian Games in ‘Three Days Event’. He was honoured with an Arjuna Award in 1984. He hailed from Rajasthan state. He served in the Indian army and was decorated with VSM. Khan also served as international FEI judge in Jumping and Dressage.

Khan died on May 1, 2021, after contracting COVID-19 amid the COVID-19 pandemic in India. He was 74 years old.

His Son Riyaz Khan studied in Central School, R.K.Puram, New Delhi during 1982

References 

1946 births
2021 deaths
Indian male equestrians
Equestrians from Rajasthan
Indian Army personnel
Recipients of the Arjuna Award
Indian Muslims
Indian dressage riders
Military personnel from Rajasthan
Place of birth missing
Asian Games medalists in equestrian
Equestrians at the 1982 Asian Games
Equestrians at the 1986 Asian Games
Asian Games gold medalists for India
Asian Games silver medalists for India
Asian Games bronze medalists for India
Medalists at the 1982 Asian Games
Medalists at the 1986 Asian Games
Deaths from the COVID-19 pandemic in India